The 75 members of the Legislative Council of Northern Rhodesia, later the National Assembly of Zambia, from 1964 until 1968 were elected in January 1964. A total of 29 candidates were returned unopposed, including 24 United National Independence Party members and five Zambian African National Congress.

List of members

Main roll seats

Reserved roll seats

Replacements
During the term of the National Assembly, several by-elections took place to replace members, or in cases where members had changed parties.

Non-elected members

References 

1964
1964